Blood to the Head (French: Le sang à la tête) is a 1956 French drama film directed by Gilles Grangier and starring Jean Gabin, Paul Frankeur and Claude Sylvain. It is based on the 1942 novel Young Cardinaud by Georges Simenon.

It was shot at the Epinay Studios and on location in La Rochelle. The film's sets were designed by the art director Robert Bouladoux.

Cast
 Jean Gabin as François Cardinaud
 Paul Frankeur as Drouin
 Claude Sylvain as Raymonde Babin
 Georgette Anys as Titine Babin
 José Quaglio as Mimile Babin
 Paul Faivre as Monsieur Cardinaud - père
 Léonce Corne as Charles Mandine
 Florelle as Sidonie Vauquier
 Paul Azaïs as Alphonse, le patron des 'Charentes'
 Rivers Cadet as Le patron du Robinson 
 Paul Oettly as Vauquier
 Yolande Laffon as Isabelle Mandine
 Julienne Paroli as Madame Cardinaud - mère 
 Gabriel Gobin as Arthur Cardinaud
 Marcel Pérès as Thévenot, un marinier 
 Rudy Palmer as Vittorio
 Hugues Wanner as L'expert
 Joël Schmitt as 	Le patron du 'Grand Café'
 Jean-Louis Bras as Jean Cardinaud 
 Monique Mélinand as Marthe Cardinaud
 Henri Crémieux as Hubert Mandine
 Renée Faure as Mademoiselle

References

Bibliography 
Oscherwitz,  Dayna & Higgins, MaryEllen. The A to Z of French Cinema. Scarecrow Press, 2009.

External links 
 

1956 films
1956 drama films
French drama films
1950s French-language films
Films directed by Gilles Grangier
Films shot at Epinay Studios
Films based on works by Georges Simenon
Films based on Belgian novels
Films set in La Rochelle
Films with screenplays by Michel Audiard
1950s French films
French black-and-white films